Morrison & Sinclair was a Sydney, New South Wales based company and one of the great ship and boat-building names of Port Jackson. The company was founded in the early 1890s and ceased trading in 1970.

History
In 1923, Morrison & Sinclair Ltd transferred from Johnson's Bay in Balmain to a site at the end of Long Nose Point on the Balmain Peninsula and carried out a shipbuilding operations there until the company ceased trading in 1970.

The company designed, constructed and repaired Government vessels, Naval, island trading and merchant ships and many Sydney Ferries and yachts. The yacht Morna (later Kurrewa IV), which won line honours 7 times from 10 starts in the Sydney to Hobart Yacht Race, was built here. (But, MORNA was built in 1913 - obviously at the Johnsons Bay site).  Morrison & Sinclair Ltd no longer exists but the records of the company are held by the State Library of New South Wales.

On 17 June 1971, the shipbuilding land was acquired by the State Planning Authority of New South Wales for A$185,000. Landscaping was carried out by Bruce Mackenzie & Associates and the site, then known as Long Nose Park, placed under Leichhardt Council control in 1981. The park won the 1986 Australian Institute of Landscape Architects Award of Merit. The park has since been renamed Yurulbin Park.

See also
 The nearby suburbs Balmain and Rozelle both located on the Balmain Peninsula.
 Thomas Sutcliffe Mort, co-founder of the Dry Dock and Engineering Works at nearby Mort Bay.

References
 Solling, M; Reynolds, P; Leichhardt: On the margins of the city, Allen & Unwin, 1997, .
 Leichhardt Municipal Council; Leichhardt Development Control Plan Part-A, 2000.
 Leichhardt Municipal Council; Sport and Recreation Matters, Autumn 2005.
 On-site Information Plaques; Yurulbin Park, Birchgrove, NSW.
 Heritage Group of Leichhardt District; Our History & Heritage, p2, May 2006.

External links 

 Local Images at InnerWest ImageBank
 Local History Collection, Leichhardt Council

Manufacturing companies based in Sydney
Shipbuilding companies of Australia
Maritime history of Australia
Birchgrove, New South Wales
Balmain, New South Wales

Shipyards of New South Wales